Fred Raskin,  (born September 26, 1973) is an American film editor. He is best known for editing three installments in The Fast and the Furious film series and Quentin Tarantino's Django Unchained, The Hateful Eight and Once Upon a Time in Hollywood. He graduated from New York University's Tisch School of the Arts (1991–1995).

In 2015, he was nominated for the ACE Eddie Award for Best Edited Feature Film (Comedy or Musical) for his editing work on Guardians of the Galaxy, along with Hughes Winborne and Craig Wood.

Filmography

References

External links

1973 births
Artists from Philadelphia
Living people
American film editors
Jack M. Barrack Hebrew Academy alumni